Adult Contemporary is a chart published by Billboard ranking the top-performing songs in the United States in the adult contemporary music (AC) market.  In 1973, 26 songs topped the chart, then published under the title Easy Listening, based on playlists submitted by easy listening radio stations and sales reports submitted by stores.

In the first issue of Billboard of 1973, the band Bread retained the number one position from the final chart of the previous year with "Sweet Surrender", but the group held the top spot for only one further week before being replaced by "Been to Canaan" by Carole King.  Helen Reddy had the highest total number of weeks at number one in 1973, spending two weeks in the top spot with "Delta Dawn" and four with "Leave Me Alone (Ruby Red Dress)".  The latter song tied with "All I Know" by Art Garfunkel for the year's longest unbroken run at number one.  Reddy, The Carpenters and Tony Orlando and Dawn were the only acts with more than one chart-topper during the year.  Among acts to top the Easy Listening chart for the first time in 1973 was English singer Elton John,   a singer who would achieve consistent success on the chart for more than 40 years.  By 2016 he held the records for both the greatest number of hits and the largest amount of number ones on the chart, and five years earlier Billboard had named him the most successful act of the listing's first 50 years.

The final number one of the year was "Time in a Bottle" by Jim Croce, which moved into the top spot in the issue of Billboard dated December 30.  It was a posthumous chart-topper for the singer, who had died in an airplane crash three months earlier.  The song also topped Billboards all-genre single chart, the Hot 100.  In the early 1970s there was considerable crossover between the two charts, and seven of 1973's other Easy Listening number ones also reached the top spot on the Hot 100: "You're So Vain" by Carly Simon, "Tie a Yellow Ribbon Round the Ole Oak Tree" by Tony Orlando and Dawn, "My Love" by Paul McCartney and Wings, "Touch Me in the Morning" by Diana Ross, "Delta Dawn" by Helen Reddy, "The Most Beautiful Girl" by Charlie Rich, and "You Are the Sunshine of My Life" by Stevie Wonder.  Rich's song was a triple chart-topper, as it also reached number one on the Hot Country Songs chart.

Chart history

References

See also
1973 in music
List of artists who reached number one on the U.S. Adult Contemporary chart

1973
1973 record charts